Kulhanamau is a village in Jaunpur, Uttar Pradesh, India.

References

Villages in Jaunpur district